The Acorn Network Computer was a network computer (a type of thin client) designed and manufactured by Acorn Computers Ltd. It was the implementation of the Network Computer Reference Profile that Oracle Corporation commissioned Acorn to specify for network computers (for more detail on the history, see Acorn's Network Computer). Sophie Wilson of Acorn led the effort. It was launched in August 1996.

The NCOS operating system used in this first implementation was based on RISC OS and ran on ARM hardware.  Manufacturing obligations were achieved through a contract with Fujitsu subsidiary D2D.

Hardware models

Original model
The NetStation was available in two versions, one with a modem for home use via a television, and a version with an Ethernet card for use in businesses and schools with VGA monitors and an on-site BSD Unix fileserver based on RiscBSD, an early ARM port of NetBSD. Both versions were upgradable, as the modem and Ethernet cards were replaceable "podules" (Acorn-format Eurocards). The home version was trialled in 1997/98 in conjunction with BT.

They had identical specifications. The  used a StrongARM SA-110 200 MHz processor. The ARM7500-based DeskLite was launched in 1998.

StrongARM
Acorn continued to produce ARM-based designs, demonstrating its first StrongARM prototype in May 1996, and the  6 months later. This evolved into the CoNCord, launched in late 1997.

New markets

Later versions

The second generation Network Computer operating system was no longer based on RISC OS, and instead consisted of NetBSD 1.2.1 code. Later NCs were produced based on the Intel Pentium architecture.

Usage
The NetStation was planned to ship with a smart card to enable internet banking.

See also
 Mac NC

References

External links
The Full Acorn Machine List: NC

Network Computer
Network computer (brand)